The GWR Class 850 was an extensive class of small  locomotives designed by George Armstrong and built at the Wolverhampton railway works of the Great Western Railway between 1874 and 1895. Aptly described as the GWR equivalent of the LB&SCR "Terrier" Class of William Stroudley, their wide availability and lively performance gave them long lives, and eventually they were replaced from 1949 by what were in essence very similar locomotives, the short-lived 1600 Class of Frederick Hawksworth, which in the headlong abandonment of steam outlived them by a mere seven years or so.

Construction
The 850 Class originally consisted of 50 locomotives comprising 48 new and two rebuilds.  The rebuilds, Nos. 93 and 94, were supplied in 1875 and 1877 as renewals of the original Gooch locomotives of 1860. Later, as locomotives were rebuilt, the 120 locomotives of the 1901 class were incorporated into the 850 class to make a total of 170 locomotives. It has been claimed that Nos. 1216-1227 were part of the 1901 class but this seems unlikely because they were built before the 1901 class was introduced.

850 class

1901 class

Modifications
The original 36 locomotives had their domes on the firebox, while the domes of the rest were on the middle of the boiler. The two classes became more uniform on rebuilding. They had inside frames. Pannier tanks were fitted from 1910, as rebuilding with Belpaire boilers took place, and from 1924 larger coal bunkers were fitted to many of the class. Seventeen locomotives retained their saddle tanks to the end. These were Nos. 855, 864, 873, 990, 991, 1216, 1904, 1913, 1925, 1932, 1933, 1939, 1944, 1963, 1981, 1984, & 2007.

Use
The engines were widely spread over the GWR network. They were useful for shunting in dock areas, as at Plymouth, Bristol, Llanelly, and Birkenhead, which was their last stronghold; in 1881-2 four went new to the Cornwall Minerals Railway. In 1906 and 1913 four were sold into industrial service, followed by four more in 1939. Up to 1927 the class were used on empty stock work at Paddington.

Crane tanks
In 1901 two 0-6-4PT crane engines were built at Swindon for use around the works. They consisted of a class 850 engine with the frames extended backwards to hold a steam crane supported by a 4-wheel trailing bogie. They were Nos. 17 Cyclops and 18 Steropes. A third, No. 16 Hercules, followed in 1921. All three were scrapped in 1936.

British Railways
One 850 class (no. 992) and forty-three former 1901 class locomotives passed into British Railways (BR) ownership in 1948 and were given the power classication "2F". According to Ian Allan, BR called them 1901 class (including No. 992). Ten were painted in BR unlined black, and the last examples survived as late as 1958, the last Armstrong engines in service.

Only three unconverted saddle tanks survived into nationalisation. Of these, two were from the 850 class, Nos. 1925 and 2007, which were withdrawn in 1951 and 1949. The other was GWR 2021 Class No. 2048, which was rebuilt as a pannier tank locomotive shortly after nationalisation and scrapped in 1952. Locomotive No. 1925 featured in the 1949 movie The Chiltern Hundreds when it is seen arriving with a train at  station.

Ian Allan gives the following details for the 1901 class in 1948:
 BR numbers, 992 and 1903-2019 (with gaps)
 Total, 44 locomotives
 Weight, 36 tons 3 cwt (full)
 Boiler pressure, 165 psi
 Cylinders, 16in x 24in
 Driving wheels, 4ft 1.5in
 Tractive effort, 17,410 lbf
 Route availability, unclassed

References

0850
0-6-0ST locomotives
Railway locomotives introduced in 1874
Scrapped locomotives